James Bordas (20 August 1929 – 28 December 2020) was a French politician.

References

1929 births
2020 deaths
20th-century French politicians
21st-century French politicians
French Senators of the Fifth Republic
Mayors of places in Centre-Val de Loire